Geba, also known as Eastern Bwe, is a Karen language of Burma.

Distribution
Northern Kayin State: Thandaunggyi township (140 villages)
Bago Region
Mandalay Region: Pyinmana township
Shan State: Pekon and Pinlaung townships
Kayah State

Dialects
Sawkho
Gerkho-Geba
Thamitaik (Sawkeepho)

Phonology 
The consonant inventory of Geba is presented below. The consonants in parentheses occur rarely and confirming whether they are phonemes would require further research.

References

Naw, Hsar Shee. 2008. A Descriptive Grammar of Geba Karen. Master's thesis, Payap University.

External links
Geba Karen basic lexicon at the Global Lexicostatistical Database

Karenic languages